Pargan (also Romanized as Pargān; also known as Parkān, Poorgan, Por Kon, Porūkān, Pūrgān, and Pūrkān) is a village in Banestan Rural District, in the Central District of Behabad County, Yazd Province, Iran. At the 2006 census, its population was 33, in 7 families.

References 

Populated places in Behabad County